Michał Kasperowicz (born 8 April 1986) is a Polish bobsledder. He competed at the FIBT World Championships 2011 in Königssee, and at the FIBT World Championships 2013 in St. Moritz. He competed at the 2014 Winter Olympics in Sochi, in four-man bobsleigh.

References

External links

1986 births
Living people
Bobsledders at the 2014 Winter Olympics
Polish male bobsledders
Olympic bobsledders of Poland
Place of birth missing (living people)